Pitcairnia paniculata is a plant species in the genus Pitcairnia. This species is native to Bolivia.

References

paniculata
Flora of Bolivia